Semo La is a mountain pass situated in Coqên County, Ngari Prefecture in the central part of Tibet and gives access to the Changtang region. It is found on the so-called Northern Route, north of Raka and south of Town of Coqên in Central Tibet. Travellers use this route as an alternative access route to western Tibet and Mount Kailash, especially when mud makes access by the more southern route difficult.

The road crossing the pass was once an old unsurfaced track travelled only by a weekly bus and trucks heading west to avoid the boggy parts of the south of the country. The construction of paved road through the pass, Tibet Provincial Road S206, was finished in late 2015.

Elevation
In 2005, a Catalan cartographic expedition certified the height to be . 

At , Semo La may be the highest asphalted road in the world.

See also
 List of extreme points of China

References

Mountain passes of Tibet
Mountain passes of China
Transhimalayas
Tibetan Plateau
Ngari Prefecture